Saint Bain (or Bainus, Bagne, Bagnus; died ), a disciple of Saint Vandrille, was a bishop of Thérouanne in northwest France, and then abbot of the monastery of Saint Wandrille in Normandy. His feast day is 20 June.

Monks of Ramsgate account

The monks of St Augustine's Abbey, Ramsgate wrote in their Book of Saints (1921),

Butler's account

The hagiographer Alban Butler (1710–1773) wrote in his Lives of the Fathers, Martyrs, and Other Principal Saints under June 20,

Migne's account

Jacques Paul Migne (1800–1875) in his Encyclopédie théologique: Dictionnaire de philosophie catholique wrote,

Notes

Citations

Sources

 
 
 

8th-century Frankish saints
711 deaths